The Cronulla Surf Life Saving Club, was one of the first surf clubs established in Australia in 1907. The club had very humble beginnings in a tram carriage and today the clubhouse is housed in a magnificent art deco building on the beachfront, that was built in 1940.

Cronulla is one of the largest and strongest clubs in the surf life saving movement with 1,200 members, including 620 in its nipper ranks. Many lifesavers volunteer their time to patrol the beaches during the season from late September to late April. Cronulla has won three World Life Saving Championships encompassing all rescue and Surf Life Saving competitions and has consistently placed in the top 10 clubs at the Australian championships over the past 20 years.

See also

Surf lifesaving
Surf Life Saving Australia
List of Australian surf lifesaving clubs

References

External links
 

1907 establishments in Australia
Sports clubs established in 1907
Surf Life Saving Australia clubs
Sporting clubs in Sydney
Cronulla, New South Wales